Campiña Sur is an administrative division (comarca) in the province of Badajoz, Extremadura, Spain. Its capital and administrative center is the municipality of Llerena.

The comarca is located in the southeast of the province. To the north, it borders the comarcas of La Serena, Tierra de Mérida - Vegas Bajas and Tierra de Barros; to the west, it borders Sierra Suroeste; and to the southwest, it borders Tentudía. Campiña Sur abuts the province of Córdoba to the east, and the province of Sevilla to the south.

Municipalities 
The comarca contains the following municipalities:

 Ahillones
 Azuaga
 Berlanga
 Campillo de Llerena
 Casas de Reina
 Fuente del Arco
 Granja de Torrehermosa
 Higuera de Llerena
 Llera
 Llerena
 Maguilla
 Malcocinado
 Peraleda del Zaucejo
 Puebla del Maestre
 Reina
 Retamal de Llerena
 Trasierra
 Usagre
 Valencia de las Torres
 Valverde de Llerena 
 Villagarcía de la Torre

References

Comarcas of Extremadura
Province of Badajoz